Elections to Manchester City Council took place on 3 May 2007. One third of the council was up for election, with each successful candidate to serve a four-year term of office, expiring in 2011. The council stayed under Labour Party control, on a reduced turnout of 28.3%.

Election result
Changes compared to the 2006 election.

Ward results
Below is a list of the 32 individual wards with the candidates standing in those wards and the number of votes the candidates acquired. The winning candidate per ward is in bold.

Ancoats and Clayton

Ardwick

Baguley

Bradford

Brooklands

Burnage

Charlestown

Cheetham

Chorlton

Chorlton Park

City Centre

Crumpsall

Didsbury East

Didsbury West

Fallowfield

Gorton North

Gorton South

Harpurhey

Higher Blackley

Hulme

Levenshulme

Longsight

Miles Platting and Newton Heath

Moss Side

Moston

Northenden

Old Moat

Rusholme

Sharston

Whalley Range

Withington

Woodhouse Park

Changes between 2007 and 2008

Charlestown By-Election 14 June 2007

References

Manchester
2007
2000s in Manchester